A marketspace is an information and communication-based digital exchange environment. It is a marketing concept that emerged in the mid-1990s. In marketspaces, physical boundaries do interfere with buy/sell decisions. Several industry-specific marketspaces are available. The term was introduced by Jeffrey Rayport and John Sviokla in their 1994 article "Managing in the Marketspace" that appeared in Harvard Business Review.

Definition
A marketspace is an information and communication-based digital exchange environment. In a marketspace, information and/or physical goods are exchanged, and transactions take place through computers, using networked elements such as blogs, forums and dedicated applications. Businesses and customers create conversations about products and services, conversations outside the sphere of control of a given business (such as a physical store) when a marketing campaign or customer-service issue captures the attention of consumers. Later, the term internet came to encompass the same concepts.

Marketplace 
A marketspace provides similar services for buyers and sellers. Sellers can list their goods, while buyers can list their needs. The marketspace matches appropriate buyers and sellers based on matching price, location and timing. Online marketplaces such as Etsy or eBay allow vendors to display and sell products taking advantage of the traffic to the site. The marketplace owner typically takes a commission on the sale.

In 1999, The Cluetrain Manifesto discussed the notions surrounding how the traditional marketplace (or bazaar) was adapting itself to the age of the webwhere "markets were conversations". By 2010, online marketplaces such as Amazon, eBay, Facebook had established dominant positions.

Impact 
The Harvard Business Review article led to various academic investigations, especially in international business. Jim Hamill, a reader in the marketing department at the University of Strathclyde in Scotland, U.K., at the time, was one of the first to note this link in a 1997 paper.

Bibliography
 Rayport and Sviokla (1995), Exploiting the virtual value chain, Harvard Business Review.
 Rayport and Sviokla (1994), Managing in the marketplace, Harvard Business Review  (Nov.-Dec. 1994): 141–150.

References 

Market (economics)
Online marketplaces